The A303 is a trunk road in southern England, running between Basingstoke in Hampshire and Honiton in Devon via Stonehenge.   Connecting the M3 and the A30, it is part of one of the main routes from London to Devon and Cornwall. It is a primary A road throughout its length, passing through five counties.

The road has evolved from historical routes, some of which are thousands of years old, including the Harrow Way and the Fosse Way. The modern route was first laid out in the early 19th century as the New Direct Road, a faster coaching route from London to Exeter. It was initially in demand but fell into disuse as railways became popular from the 1840s onwards. It was not thought of as a significant through route when roads were initially numbered, but was revived as a major road in 1933, eventually becoming a trunk road in 1958. Since then, the A303 has gradually been upgraded to modern standards, though there are still several unimproved parts with longstanding plans to fix them.

As a primary route to southwestern England, the A303 is frequently congested on its single carriageway sections. It passes through the Stonehenge World Heritage Site and the Blackdown Hills Area of Outstanding Natural Beauty, and attempts to upgrade the road in those areas have been controversial. In particular, the Stonehenge tunnel, which would see the A303 rerouted underground, has been proposed and delayed several times. Nevertheless, the road remains a popular alternative to motorway driving.

Route

It starts at the M3 motorway south of Basingstoke at Junction 8, as a dual carriageway. It heads south west, crossing the A34 near Bullington before passing south of Andover. The road then passes by Solstice Park and Bulford Camp before bypassing Amesbury and entering the Stonehenge World Heritage Site. The route then becomes single carriageway before passing Stonehenge itself. The presence of the road through a World Heritage Site has been controversial for decades. As part of long-term plans, the A344 road which once joined the A303 at Stonehenge has been removed.

After Winterbourne Stoke the route once again becomes dual carriageway from Yarnbury Castle and across the Wylye valley, meeting the A36 at Deptford. There is then another section of single carriageway road, coming out of the valley and up to the crest of the Great Ridge, before a further section of dual two lane road down from the hill crest near Berwick St Leonard. On reaching the valley, it reverts again to single carriageway and through the village of Chicklade, before following the terrain over to Mere, where it runs north of the town as another dual carriageway bypass. Continuing west, it passes south of Wincanton and then north of Sparkford to a roundabout where the road reverts once more to single carriageway.

The road then bypasses Ilchester and RNAS Yeovilton and widens to dual carriageway again. Between Ilchester and Shores Bridge (over the River Parrett, east of South Petherton) the road follows the course of the Roman Fosse Way. At Yeovilton the road becomes dual two lane again, and connects with the A37 which joins it until it reaches the end of the bypass. This final section of dual carriageway ends at South Petherton. It runs north of Ilminster as a three-lane road where it meets the A358, providing access to the M5 motorway.

The A303 is of a lower standard west of Ilminster and is no longer considered part of the strategic road network. It passes through the Blackdown Hills as a narrow road following the contours of the land, with the exception of a dual-carriageway bypass of Marsh. The end of the A303 is reached where it joins the A30, which enters as a side road and continues as the main route forward for Honiton and Exeter.

The A303 roughly parallels the West of England line, which competes for long-distance traffic. Although the A303 as a whole is designed to be part of a route from London to Exeter, a popular alternative is to take the M4 motorway to Bristol, followed by the M5. This is a high-quality motorway route throughout, but a considerably longer distance.

History

Early history
Parts of the A303, such as the section past Stonehenge, have been a right of way for people, wagons, and later motor vehicles for millennia. Portions of it follow the Harrow Way, an ancient trackway across Wessex that is one of Britain's oldest roads, reportedly being used as long ago as 3,000 BC. Other sections run on part of the Fosse Way, a Roman road between Exeter and Lincoln constructed around 49 AD.

A section of the A303 around Weyhill, west of Andover, runs alongside a ditch thought to be constructed during the Bronze Age. Several historic roads converged at Weyhill, which is believed to have hosted a popular market since the Middle Ages, eventually becoming one of the most important in England by the 19th century. The market closed in the 1950s.

19th century
The modern course of the A303 was designed in the early 19th century as the "New Direct Road" by William Hanning, chief engineer of the Ilminster Turnpike Trust, in order to improve coaching traffic to southwest England. Russells of Exeter began a coach service along it, though they quickly reverted to the older coaching route further south (now part of the A30). Along with engineer Goldsworthy Gurney, Hanning attempted to design a steam-powered coach that could be run along the New Direct Road. After an experimental round trip to Bath, he invested £10,000 in steam carriages. Sir Charles Dance bought three carriages for trips between Cheltenham and Gloucester, but traditional horse-operated stagecoach operators sabotaged the route and Hanning's carriages did not gain widespread adoption. Nevertheless, the New Direct Road became increasingly used as a coaching route between London and Exeter in the 1820s. Ann Nelson's "Exeter Telegraph", a coach from London to Devon via the New Direct Road, could travel from Piccadilly to Devonport in a little over 21 hours. It remained a popular coaching route until the arrival of railways in the 1840s.

The widespread adoption of railways during railway mania caused coaching services to dry up. Along with many other turnpike routes, the New Direct Road fell into disrepair during the 19th century owing to a lack of funds and available staff. By the turn of the 20th century, it had become little more than a rough track in places, making it difficult to drive on.

20th century
 
Road designations were first allocated by the Ministry of Transport in the early 1920s, but the New Direct Road was not initially considered a major through route. Instead, the older coaching road further south via Salisbury and Yeovil was determined to be the main road. Maps produced by companies independent to the Ordnance Survey, the Government's official mapping body, marked the New Direct Road as a "class I" route anyway.

The A303 was created on 1 April 1933 as the "Alternative London – Exeter route" after the Ministry of Transport realised the New Direct Road was still useful as a major road for motor traffic. The route created a long bypass for sections of the A30 that ran south of it.

In 1958, the Ministry of Transport upgraded the A303 to trunk road status. It believed it was easier to upgrade than the parallel A30 as it passed through fewer towns. Andover and Amesbury were bypassed in 1969, while general improvements to the road, including additional dualling, took place throughout the 1970s.

In 1971, the Environment Secretary, Peter Walker announced the entire length of the A303 would be upgraded as part of a new roads programme that would deliver 1,000 new miles of motorway by 1980. A bypass of Marsh was opened in 1976; it was (and remains) the only dual carriageway upgrade of the A303 through the Blackdown Hills. By the mid-1980s, the A303 had been extended from its original fork by Micheldever Station, next to the A30, eastwards to meet the M3 motorway, and was a completely uninterrupted dual carriageway westwards as far as Amesbury. Ilminster was bypassed around this time; however the new road was built as single carriageway with 3 lanes, which caused a serious safety hazard leading to several fatal accidents.

21st century
In 2014, the A303 was one of several routes earmarked for improvement by the Government, who planned to spend £15 billion on upgrades nationwide. The Prime Minister, David Cameron, said the road "held parts of our country back".

In 2017, the Government approved plans for a  tunnel to replace the section of the road near Stonehenge. The tunnel would pass the historic site at a greater distance than the current stretch of overground road. The scheme was reiterated in the 2020 budget. The proposals continued to attract opposition over their environmental impact, and protesters were successful in a July 2021 judicial review, with the judge ruling that the Transport Secretary's decision to proceed with the tunnel was "unlawful".

Traffic

Since the 1950s, the A303 has been criticised for being inadequate for the level of traffic along it. The switches between the latter to the former act as bottlenecks and are major sources of congestion along the route. Upgrading the remaining sections of road is difficult due to environmental concerns; in 1986, an upgrade of the A303 in Hampshire caused public outcry after the work destroyed the remains of an Iron Age settlement, and consequently, £100,000 was spent on emergency rescue excavation work.

The A303 is particularly congested during the Summer solstice (around 21 June), when Stonehenge forms a major part of festivities. During the so-called "Battle of Stonehenge" on 1 June 1985, where 520 people clashed violently with police, roadblocks were set up over a  radius around the site. A convoy of trucks managed to break through a block at Cholderton, leading to increased violence. Conflicts were repeated for several years in the 1980s; in 1988 a van overturned on the A303 after leaving a clash with police at Stonehenge, killing one passenger and injuring ten others. As well as Stonehenge, the A303 is part of one of the main routes from London to the Glastonbury Festival. During the weekend of the festival in late June, the road is generally gridlocked as people drive towards or away from the festival grounds in Pilton.

The Government's Road Investment Strategy has committed to upgrading all the remaining single carriage sections of the A303 as far as Ilminster. Highways England have made numerous proposals to improve the road, and it is currently identified under several Nationally Significant Infrastructure Projects.

Future

Stonehenge improvements

The most controversial upgrade of the A303 has been improvement to the road through the Stonehenge World Heritage Site, where it remains a congested single carriageway road. There were minor improvements in the 1960s, including closing the road for a month in 1967 for levelling and resurfacing. A proposal to fully dual the A303 past Stonehenge was announced in the mid-1970s, but was criticised as being "an environmental disaster" and comparable to driving a dual carriageway through Westminster Abbey. A more comprehensive solution was discussed in 1989's Roads for Prosperity programme, which included upgrading the road to dual carriageway and bypassing Winterborne Stoke. In 1993, the Minister for Roads, Kenneth Carlisle, announced plans for either a  tunnel or a diversion of the A303 a mile from Stonehenge, costing £44 million and £22 million respectively. Although the new Labour government cancelled many road schemes after coming to power in 1997, there was still general support for a tunnel at Stonehenge.

In 2003,  of improvements, including the proposed  road tunnel bored under land adjacent to Stonehenge, were announced by the Secretary of State for Transport as part of a package of road improvements. A public enquiry into whether the plans were adequate was announced; it concluded that they were, despite protests from charities and landowners that the tunnel should be longer. Two years later, it was announced that there was to be a review of the options for Stonehenge, starting in January 2006, as costs had doubled. The government cancelled the whole scheme at the end of 2007 owing to excessive environmental constraints.

After decades of debate, the A303's junction with the A344, just east of Stonehenge, was closed in 2013 as part of improvements to visitor facilities. During this work, a roadside monument was moved to the visitor centre; the stone monument is to Captain Eustace Loraine and Staff-Sergeant Richard Wilson, killed in July 1912 in the first fatal accident of the recently formed Royal Flying Corps.

In 2016, the Stonehenge tunnel was revived by the Government, who awarded a £17.5m design contract to build a  tunnel. Local residents were pleased with the news, but a survey suggested 90% still preferred a diversion away from the stones instead. The plan was finalised the following year as part of a £2 billion programme. Transport Secretary Chris Grayling said the improvements would "transform" the A303 and would be important for removing congestion. In November 2020, the plans were confirmed again in a report by Transport Secretary Andrew Stephenson, and endorsed by Highways England. Though the Government said it had carefully listened to all opinions on the tunnel, the decision to proceed was condemned by environmental campaigners.

In July 2021, the tunnel proposals were overturned in the High Court of Justice. A hearing concluded that transport secretary Grant Shapps had "acted irrationally and unlawfully" by backing the project and failed to properly assess the environmental impacts of each asset on the Stonehenge World Heritage Site as required by planning law. Campaigners for the Stonehenge Alliance welcomed the decision, but Historic England expressed frustration over the "missed opportunity to remove the intrusive sight and sound of traffic past the iconic monument".

The village of Winterbourne Stoke is immediately west of the World Heritage Site, and proposals to improve the A303 in this area have generally added a bypass for it in the plans. There have also been proposals to build a bypass as a standalone project, without requiring the improvements around Stonehenge.

A303/A358 South Petherton to M5 Taunton
In November 2004, plans to improve the route through the Blackdown Hills (an Area of Outstanding Natural Beauty) were abandoned in favour of upgrading the A358 from Ilminster to the M5 motorway at Taunton to reduce traffic west of Ilminster. The scheme was the subject of a public consultation in March 2007, and incorporated plans to widen the Ilminster bypass from South Petherton to a dual two-lane road. The plans were shelved in 2009 when it was concluded that the dualling could not be funded from the Regional Funding Allocation for the South West. In 2016, the plans were revived by Highways England, with a final decision expected to be announced the following year.

In 2019, the preferred route of the A358 upgrade was revealed, and in 2020 the government confirmed funding for the A358 scheme and dualling of the A303 between Sparkford and Podimore.

Other schemes
A number of other schemes for the remaining below-standard parts of the A303 were considered in the 1990s, including improvements west of Ilminster towards Marsh, and the single-carriageway section around Yeovilton. These proposals were all cancelled in 1998. The schemes were later remitted to the London to South West and South Wales Multi-Modal Study (SWARMMS), and the conclusion of the report was that all of the schemes east of Ilminster should go ahead; and to avoid building a dual carriageway through the Blackdown Hills the A358 should be upgraded to the M5 at Taunton. In 2009, none were considered to be regional priorities, so no other improvements were likely to be funded in the short term.

In 2016, Devon County Council announced they would self-fund improvements to the A303 between Ilminster and Honiton, which was not included in Highways England's list. The council put together three proposals for alternative routes, with the aim of securing £170 million of Government funding once a preferred route is chosen.

Plans to improve the A303 between Sparkford and Ilchester by upgrading three miles of single carriageway to high-quality dual carriageway were approved by the government in February 2021. Work began on this section that October.

Cultural references

Kula Shaker performed their first impromptu gig at the Glastonbury Festival, which can be reached via the A303. The road was the inspiration for the song "303" on their debut album K. The road was also mentioned in the Levellers' song "Battle of the Beanfield", about the attack by police on travellers celebrating the Solstice at Stonehenge (1 June 1985):  "Down the '303 at the end of the road, Flashing lights, exclusion zones".

Prior to the broadcast of Series 15 of Top Gear in 2010, the cast of Jeremy Clarkson, Richard Hammond and James May were spotted and recorded driving along the A303 in what appeared to be house cars. The video was recorded and put on YouTube.

In 2011, BBC Four broadcast the documentary A303 Highway to the Sun. The writer Tom Fort drove the length of the A303 in a Morris Traveller, making various stops. The following year, he published a book with the same title; it covers the history of the road, and British road planning, together with landscape, history and general travel writing. During research, one interviewee recommended using the A303 to reach southwest England, adding it was "less boring than the motorway, and you've always got Stonehenge". The programme was praised for its eclecticism and enthusiasm for what could have been a tedious subject.

Junctions and landmarks
There are a wide variety of junctions on the A303. These range from motorway-style free-flowing junctions such as that with the A36 near Wylye, to simple forks on the single carriageway sections. 

Some junctions, such as the Countess Roundabout with the A345 near Amesbury, and the Podimore roundabout with the A37, are known congestion hotspots because they are insufficient to cope with traffic. Other former junctions, such as the A344 near Stonehenge, have been removed in order to help traffic flow and avoid congestion and accidents.

References
Notes

Citations

Sources

External links

 Route of A303 on an OpenStreetMap layer
 A303 – CBRD
 BBC, 2011 A303: Highway to the Sun BBC Four
 SABRE – A303
 In Celebration of A Great British Road : The A303 – BBC America
 Save Stonehenge – campaign site to prevent work on the A303 around Stonehenge

Roads in England
Roads in Devon
Roads in Hampshire
Roads in Somerset
Roads in Wiltshire